Kloten is an unincorporated community in Nelson County, North Dakota, United States.

Education
Kloten is served by Dakota Prairie School District.

References

External links
  Dakota Prairie School District

Unincorporated communities in North Dakota
Unincorporated communities in Nelson County, North Dakota